Jean-Pierre Dusséaux (born on January 28, 1950, in Cambrai, France) is a French television producer, screenwriter, and theatre director.

Works

Television

Producer

Screenwriter
 1998: Louise et les Marchés, with Line Renaud ;
 2007: La Lance de la destinée, with Jacques Perrin et Jacques Weber.

Cinema

Producer 
 2003: Zéro défaut by Pierre Schoeller
 2011: Je m'appelle Bernadette  by Jean Sagols.

Theater 
 1976: Abahn Sabana David by Marguerite Duras, Biothéâtre,
 1977: La Jeune Fille Violaine by Paul Claudel, at the Biothéâtre,
 1978: L'Aigle à deux têtes by Jean Cocteau, Théâtre de l'Athénée,
 1978-1979: La Tragique Histoire du Docteur Faust by Christopher Marlowe, at the Théâtre royal de Mons and Théâtre de Poche Bruxelles,
 1979: La Cantate à trois voix by Paul Claudel, Théâtre Le Ranelagh,
 1980: Il barbiere di Siviglia by Gioachino Rossini, Vaison-la-Romaine theater.
 1981: La Célestine by Fernando de Rojas, Théâtre royal du Parc.

Book 

 Économie de la communication TV et Radio, Presses universitaires de France, Que sais-je ? n. 2607, Paris, 1991, 128 p.

References

External links 
 Jean-Pierre Dusséaux on IMDb

1950 births
Living people
French television producers
People from Cambrai
Chevaliers of the Ordre des Arts et des Lettres
French male screenwriters
French theatre directors